Vrångö is the southernmost inhabited island in the Southern Gothenburg Archipelago and it is also a locality situated in Gothenburg Municipality, Västra Götaland County, Sweden. It had 364 inhabitants in 2010. The ferry 281 to Vrångö can be taken from Saltholmen.

References

External links

Some pictures from Vrango

Populated places in Västra Götaland County
Populated places in Gothenburg Municipality
Southern Gothenburg Archipelago
Islands of Västra Götaland County